Wolfgang Müller (6 October 1931 – 30 December 2021) was a German equestrian. He competed at the 1968 Summer Olympics and the 1972 Summer Olympics. Müller died on 30 December 2021, at the age of 90.

References

External links
 

1931 births
2021 deaths
German male equestrians
Olympic equestrians of East Germany
Equestrians at the 1968 Summer Olympics
Equestrians at the 1972 Summer Olympics
People from the Province of Brandenburg
Sportspeople from Gorzów Wielkopolski